Tasiujarjuaq (Inuktitut syllabics: ᑕᓯᐅᔭᕐᔪᐊᖅ, meaning "big lake-like lake") formerly Soper Lake is a large, irregularly shaped lake in the Qikiqtaaluk Region, Nunavut, Canada. It is located on Baffin Island's Meta Incognita Peninsula. The Inuit name references the lake's meromictic attribute, a mixture of fresh and salt water caused by a set of reversing falls and  tides in Pleasant Inlet. The fresh water of Soper River drains into the lake which then drains into the salt water of Pleasant Inlet before reaching the Arctic Ocean.

The hamlet of Kimmirut (previously, Lake Harbour) is situated at Glasgow Bay. In 1911, Hudson's Bay Company established its first south Baffin trading post at Lake Harbour.

The river and lake were named by Canadian biologist and Arctic explorer, J. Dewey Soper who travelled in the area in 1931.

Fauna
The lake is home to Greenland cod.

References

External links
 Summer temperature reconstruction based on laminae thickness in sediments from Upper Soper Lake, Baffin Island, Canada

Bodies of water of Baffin Island
Lakes of Qikiqtaaluk Region